For other songs by the same title, see Baila morena (disambiguation)

"Baila Morena" is a Portuguese-language song by Lucenzo written by Alexander Scander, Cyril Covic and Lucenzo himself. It is a follow up release to "Vem Dançar Kuduro" and "Danza Kuduro" from his album Emigrante del Mundo.

Music video
The music video was directed by Vincent Egret. It shows Lucenzo following various love interests in his car in a desert, while repairing his car in a garage or while being served at a restaurant. The final scene shows DJ Coms playing some tunes promoting Lucenzo, and the music video ends with the announcement "to be continued", it is a worldwide success.

Charts
The song has been success in France reaching #9 in the SNEP French Singles Chart charts, staying for 37 weeks in the French Charts.

Weekly charts

Year-end charts

References

2011 singles
Lucenzo songs
2010 songs
Songs written by Lucenzo